In colorimetry, whiteness is the degree to which a surface is white. An example of its use might be to quantitatively compare two pieces of paper which appear white viewed individually, but not when juxtaposed.

The International Commission on Illumination describes it in the following terms:

Calculation

where

  is the Y tristimulus value (relative luminance),
  is the chromaticity coordinate in the CIE 1931 color space
  is the chromaticity coordinate of the perfect diffuser (reference white)

The numbers in the subscript indicate the observer: two for the CIE 1931 standard observer and ten for the CIE 1964 standard observer.

Notes
 W increases with whiteness, reaching 100 for the perfect diffuser.
 The tint is green for positive T and red for negative T.
 Equal differences in W may not appear equally different.

See also
 Color temperature

References

External links
ISO 105-J02:1997 Textiles -- Tests for colour fastness -- Part J02: Instrumental assessment of relative whiteness
ISO 11475:2004 Paper and board -- Determination of CIE whiteness, D65/10 degrees (outdoor daylight)
ISO 11476:2000 Paper and board -- Determination of CIE-whiteness, C/2 degree (indoor illumination conditions)
ISO/AWI 11476 Paper and board -- Determination of CIE-whiteness, C/2 degree (indoor illumination conditions)
 Konica Minolta Sensing: The colour of White
 TAPPI - why the CIE 1931 color space does not work for white paper: COMPARATIVE STUDY OF BRIGHTNESS/WHITENESS USING VARIOUS ANALYTICAL METHODS ON COATED PAPERS CONTAINING COLORANTS Aksoy, Joyce, Fleming, Department of Paper and Printing Science and Engineering, Western Michigan University

Color
Papermaking
Shades of white